The myna is a bird of the starling family.

Myna may refer to:
Myna (film), 2013 Kannada romantic drama film
Myna Mahila Foundation, Indian organization
Myna Potts (born 1927), U.S. historical preservationist
Myna (character), character in comics album series Yoko Tsuno

See also
 Mina (disambiguation)